Sitora is a Tajik feminine given name meaning "star". It is related to the Persian name 'Setareh'.



Notable persons 
 Sitora Hamidova, Uzbekistani long-distance runner
 Sitora Farmonova, Uzbek film actress and singer
 Sitora Yusifiy, Omar Mateen’s wife

Notes

Iranian given names